Botafogo Station (previously Botafogo/Coca-Cola Station) is a subway station on the Rio de Janeiro Metro that serves the neighbourhood of Botafogo in the South Zone of Rio de Janeiro.

The station was renamed on 1 January 2021, from Botafogo Station to Botafogo/Coca-Cola Station, after a naming rights purchase by the Brazilian branch of The Coca-Cola Company. Due to the COVID-19 pandemic, Metrô Rio had been operating at a loss – in July 2020, the passenger flow was just 57% of what it had been in the same period pre-pandemic, and the accumulated deficit was already at R$ 150 million. The station's naming rights sale was used as an alternate mean to generate revenue, and it was chosen for the purchase due to its proximity to Coca-Cola's headquarters, on Botafogo Beach. This change was subsequently reverted between 5 and 7 November 2022, removing the branding and restoring the station's original name.

References

Metrô Rio stations
Railway stations opened in 1981